The 1852 United States presidential election in Maryland took place on November 2, 1852, as part of the 1852 United States presidential election. Voters chose eight representatives, or electors to the Electoral College, who voted for President and Vice President.

Maryland voted for the Democratic candidate, Franklin Pierce, over Whig candidate Winfield Scott. Pierce won Maryland by a margin of 6.59%. This was the first presidential election in which Maryland voted Democratic. In addition, in 1851, Baltimore became an independent city, and had its election results calculated separately from Baltimore County for the first time.

Results

Results by county

See also
 United States presidential elections in Maryland
 1852 United States presidential election
 1852 United States elections

Notes

References 

Maryland
1852
Presidential